"Sign of the Times" is a song by English pop/new wave band the Belle Stars, released as the fourth single from the band's self-titled only studio album. It was their seventh single overall and first single that was an original since 1981's "Another Latin Love Song". The single was the band's only top ten hit, reaching No. 3 on the UK Singles Chart in the week of 19 February 1983. It peaked at No. 75 on the Billboard Hot 100 in the week of 14 May 1983.

Background 
In 1982, the Belle Stars released three cover versions: "Iko Iko" by the Dixie Cups, "The Clapping Song" by Shirley Ellis, and "Mockingbird" by Inez & Charlie Foxx. Dave Robinson at Stiff Records, the band's record company, suggested that the band ought to perform covers to attract audiences, then after three covers write their own song, and it would be a hit. This happened to come true when the band released "Sign of the Times".

Charts

Weekly charts

Year-end charts

Music video 
The music video for the song was produced by Pete Collins. It features Stella Barker talking while staring in mid-air, and then shows Jennie Matthias popping out from below and singing. The video then centres on the band in an abandoned nightclub, wearing tuxedos and snapping their fingers. During the lyric "you give me nothing more than a shove", the band members perform the sign language gesture for "shove". This motion is shown throughout the rest of the video.

References 

1982 songs
1982 singles
The Belle Stars songs
Stiff Records singles
Song recordings produced by Peter Collins (record producer)